Thomas Anderson Goudge  (1910–1999) was a Canadian philosopher and university professor.

Career

He was born on January 19, 1910, in Halifax, Nova Scotia, son of Thomas Norman and Effie (Anderson) Goudge. He graduated from the Halifax Academy in 1927, and studied for a Bachelor of Arts degree in 1931 and a Master of Arts degree in 1932 from Dalhousie University. He obtained his Doctor of Philosophy degree from the University of Toronto in 1937 (he was a student of George Sidney Brett) after having briefly studied from 1936 to 1937 at Harvard University. He married Helen Beryl Christilaw in Blind River, Ontario, on June 23, 1936, and had one son, the jurist Stephen T. Goudge and five grandchildren, Jennifer, Suzanne, Daniel, Timothy and Amy.

He became an interim lecturer on philosophy at Waterloo College in 1934 and later served as a tutor, fellow and then lecturer in philosophy at Queen's University from 1935 to 1938. He lectured in philosophy at Toronto after that, becoming an assistant professor in 1940, an associate professor in 1945 and a full professor in 1949. He also served on the editorial committee of the University of Toronto Quarterly from 1951 on, serving as acting editor in 1955. In 1963, he became Chairman of the Department of Philosophy at Toronto. Goudge was influential in developing the noosphere concept.

He served in the Second World War, joining the Royal Canadian Naval Volunteer Reserve in 1943 as a sub-lieutenant. He was discharged at the end of the war in 1945 with the rank of a Lieutenant-Commander. 

He wrote Bergson's Introduction to Metaphysics (1949), The Thought of C. S. Peirce (1950), The Ascent of Life (1961, winning the Governor General's Award) and many articles on philosophy and related subjects. He was a member of the American Philosophical Association, the Mind Association and the Humanities Association of Canada; he also served as President of the Canadian Philosophy Association in 1964 and as President of the Charles S. Peirce Society from 1957 to 1959. He was noted for his passion for oil painting.

He died on June 20, 1999, in Toronto, Ontario.

Publications

Bergson's Introduction to Metaphysics (1949)
The Thought of C. S. Peirce (1950)
The Ascent of Life: A Philosophical Study of the Theory of Evolution (1961)

References

External links
 Thomas Anderson Goudge at The Canadian Encyclopedia
Thomas A. Goudge archival papers held at the University of Toronto Archives and Records Management Services

1910 births
1999 deaths
University of Toronto alumni
Fellows of the Royal Society of Canada
Governor General's Award-winning non-fiction writers
20th-century Canadian philosophers